Take a Chance is an album by American pianist Joanne Brackeen recorded in 1993 and released on the Concord Jazz label. It is Brakeen's second album of Brazilian music following 1991's Breath of Brazil.

Reception 

AllMusic reviewer Scott Yanow stated "This is a delightful set ... The pianist stretches the songs a bit in spots but never neglects their melodies or the original moods. Well worth several listens". In JazzTimes, Sunsh Stein stated "Joanne Brackeen's passion permeats everything she plays ... Her feel for Brazilian music also seems innate, as evidenced by this recording and its predescessor Breath of Brasil ... The band confidently carries the listener through the  many moods of Brackeen's Brazil".

Track listing 
All compositions by Joanne Brackeen except where noted.
 "Recado Bossa Nova" (Luiz Antonio, Djalma Ferreira) – 7:00
 "Children's Games" (Antônio Carlos Jobim) – 7:57
 "Estaté" (Bruno Martino, Bruno Brighetti) – 5:34
 "Canção do Sal" (Milton Nascimento) – 5:53
 "Frevo" (Egberto Gismonti) – 6:26
 "Mountain Flight" (Toninho Horta) – 5:21
 "The Island" (Ivan Lins, Vítor Martins) – 6:14
 "Take a Chance" – 4:17
 "Ponta de Areia" (Nascimento) – 4:07
 "Duduka" – 4:46
 "Mist on a Rainbow" – 4:50

Personnel 
Joanne Brackeen – piano
Eddie Gómez – bass
Duduka da Fonseca – drums
Waltinho Anastácio – percussion, vocals (track 9)

References 

Joanne Brackeen albums
1994 albums
Concord Records albums